The Group IV tournament was held June 18–21, in Colombo, Sri Lanka, on outdoor clay courts.

Format
The eight teams were split into two groups and played in a round-robin format. The top two teams of each group advanced to the promotion pool, from which the two top teams were promoted to the Asia/Oceania Zone Group III in 2004.

Pool A

Results of Individual Ties

Pool B

Results of Individual Ties

Promotion pool
The top two teams from each of Pools A and B advanced to the Promotion pool. Results and points from games against the opponent from the preliminary round were carried forward.

Results of Individual Ties

Oman and Vietnam promoted to Group III for 2004. The remaining matches were not played, since they could not have changed the outcome.

References

2003 Davis Cup Asia/Oceania Zone
Davis Cup Asia/Oceania Zone